3GPH is a community radio station owned and operated by Vision Australia as part of the Vision Australia Radio network. The station broadcasts a radio reading service to Geelong, Victoria, with 18 hours of local programming each week.

Outside of local hours, the station is a repeater of the 3RPH service from Melbourne.

References

Radio stations in Victoria
Radio stations in Geelong
Radio reading services of Australia